Terminal node may mean:

 Leaf node, a node of a tree data structure that has no child nodes.
 Lymph node, a terminal lymph node in the lymphatic system.